Ahrida Peak is the sharp rocky peak rising to 3100 m on the main crest of north-central Sentinel Range in Ellsworth Mountains, Antarctica.  It surmounts Embree Glacier to the southeast.  Ahrida is the medieval name of the Eastern Rhodope Mountains in Bulgaria.

Location
US mapping in 1961 and 1988.

See also
 Mountains in Antarctica

Maps

 Vinson Massif.  Scale 1:250 000 topographic map.  Reston, Virginia: US Geological Survey, 1988.
 Newcomer Glacier.  Scale 1:250 000 topographic map.  Reston, Virginia: US Geological Survey, 1961.
 Antarctic Digital Database (ADD). Scale 1:250000 topographic map of Antarctica. Scientific Committee on Antarctic Research (SCAR). Since 1993, regularly updated.

References
 Ahrida Peak. SCAR Composite Gazetteer of Antarctica.
 Bulgarian Antarctic Gazetteer. Antarctic Place-names Commission. (details in Bulgarian, basic data in English)

External links
 Ahrida Peak. Copernix satellite image

Ellsworth Mountains
Bulgaria and the Antarctic
Mountains of Ellsworth Land